International rankings of

Agriculture

Wine production ranked 9 in 2011
Corn production ranked 10 in 2012

Culture

Demographics

Population  ranked 25

Economy

GDP ranked 29 by the UN

Education

Globalization

Geography

Total area ranked 25

Military

Politics

Transparency International Corruption Perceptions Index 2013 ranked 72 out 177

Religion

Transportation

References

South Africa